St James the Great, Shirley is a Grade II listed parish church in the town of Shirley in Metropolitan Borough of Solihull in the West Midlands, England. It is part of the Anglican Diocese of Birmingham.

History

St James Church was started in 1831 and enlarged in 1882. In 1893, Shirley became its own ecclesiastical parish.

The church is in a joint parish with: 
St John the Divine, Tidbury Green
Christ the King, Shirley

References

Church of England church buildings in the West Midlands (county)
Churches completed in 1831
19th-century Church of England church buildings